The Battle of Poniec took place on October 28, 1704 in Poniec, Poland, during the Great Northern War. The Swedish Army under Charles XII unsuccessfully dislodged the Saxon Army under Johann Matthias von der Schulenburg through several cavalry charges.  The Saxons had deployed in a massive square formation near the village of Janiszewo, west of Poniec.

Background
In August 1704, Charles XII of Sweden marched to Lwów, Poland, which was taken after a brief siege. Augustus II the Strong, who camped in Sandomierz, took advantage of this by marching to Warsaw, where he occupied the city and captured 1,500 Swedes. When Charles XII returned to the city in October, Augustus II fell back to Kraków. General Schulenburg tried to cross the river Oder and flee to Saxony with 4,000 infantry and 900 cavalry, but these were chased by Charles XII, who with 3,000 cavalry pursued them to the city of Poniec on October 28.

The battle
Schulenberg had twelve battalions of infantry and four squadrons of cavalry, a total of 4,900 soldiers whom he was in a hurry to mobilize. He took position on a field in front of the village of Janiszewo west of Poniec. The Saxons' left wing was protected by Poniec and the right wing was protected by an impassable swamp. The center was protected by a ditch with a wagon fort behind it by which Schulenburg placed his cannons. Charles XII had four dragoon regiments. Five additional regiments could not reach the battlefield in time, which meant that the king could only command 3,000 out of the 7,000 cavalry in his army.

The battle began when the Swedes attacked the Saxon cavalry, which was quickly chased away. The Saxon infantry managed to hold back the Swedes' initial attack, thanks to Schulenburg lining up his soldiers in a large square formation. When the five Swedish regiments arrived in the battlefield during the evening, the Swedes attacked again. The Saxons were attacked from all directions, and the Swedes concentrated on attacking the gaps in enemy lines. The Swedes broke up the Saxon division, but the Saxons answered this with their powerful musket volleys. On this occasion, the Swedes retreated to Poniec in the protection of the darkness. The Saxons were then able to successfully withdraw from the battle.

References

Punitz
1704 in Europe
Poniec
Punitz
Punitz
History of Greater Poland Voivodeship
1704 in the Polish–Lithuanian Commonwealth